Suzanne Helen Suckling  (born ) is a businesswoman and commercial director from New Zealand.

Suckling was raised in Hamilton, in the North Island of New Zealand, and studied at Massey University in Palmerston North. She then moved to Christchurch to lecture at Lincoln University for two years. Following this she worked as a food technologist in the meat industry and became chief executive at Pacific Foods, a joint venture between Waitaki Refrigerated and a German company. She then worked at a merchant bank, and was later appointed to the Trade Development Board.

Suckling has held a number of positions in governance, including chair of ECL Group Ltd, Jacobsen Pacific Ltd, New Zealand Qualifications Authority, Jade Software, Lincoln Agritech Hub and founding chair of Callaghan Innovation. She is also a director of Sky City Entertainment Group and a former director of NIWA, AgriQuality Limited, Westpac and the New Zealand Dairy Board.

In 2018 Suckling was appointed chair of the Insurance & Financial Services Ombudsman Scheme Commission.

Recognition 
Suckling was named the inaugural New Zealand Business Woman of the Year in 1985, at the age of 27. In the 1996 New Year Honours, she was appointed an Officer of the Order of the British Empire, for services to business management. In 2015, Suckling was awarded an honorary doctorate in science by Lincoln University. She is a Companion of the Royal Society of New Zealand.

References

Living people
People from Hamilton, New Zealand
Massey University alumni
Academic staff of the Lincoln University (New Zealand)
New Zealand Officers of the Order of the British Empire
Companions of the Royal Society of New Zealand
Year of birth missing (living people)
New Zealand women in business
New Zealand food scientists